The Ride to Hangman's Tree is a 1967 American Western film directed by Alan Rafkin and written by Luci Ward, Jack Natteford and William Bowers. The film stars Jack Lord, Melodie Johnson, James Farentino, Don Galloway, Richard Anderson and Ed Peck. The film was released in May 1967, by Universal Pictures.

Plot

Cast 
Jack Lord as Guy Russell
Melodie Johnson as Lillie Malone
James Farentino as Matt Stone
Don Galloway as Nevada Jones
Richard Anderson as Steven Carlson
Ed Peck as Sheriff Stewart
Robert Yuro as Jeff Scott
Robert Cornthwaite as T.L. Harper
Paul Reed as Corbett
Fabian Dean as Indian 
John Pickard as Pete
Claudia Bryar as Mrs. Harmon
Robert Sorrells as Blake

Production
Parts of the film were shot at Cedar Breaks, Strawberry Valley, and Strawberry Point in Utah.

References

External links 
 

1967 films
1960s English-language films
American Western (genre) films
1967 Western (genre) films
Universal Pictures films
Films directed by Alan Rafkin
Films shot in Utah
1960s American films